Randi Hansen (born 24 November 1958, in Tromsø) is a Norwegian pop singer who formerly lived in Harstad, where she had a background as a music teacher at Heggen videregående skole. She was most active in the 1980s, and is best known for the song "Hvis æ fikk være sola di", which is on her debut album, Ho Randi. This sold 80,000 copies.

She released six solo albums before she took a pause in her career and raised a family, and has worked on twelve other albums. However, in 2008, she came back with a new album: Tid som går.

Discography
1979 – Ho Randi
1980 – Hjerterdame
1981 – Æ undres
1982 – Hjæmlandet
1983 – Stille natt, Christmas record with Olav Stedje
1985 – Ansiktet i speilet
2008 – Tid som går

References 

1958 births
Living people
Norwegian women singers
Musicians from Harstad